Novotroitskaya is a rural locality (a village) in Krivle-Ilyushkinsky Selsoviet, Kuyurgazinsky District, Bashkortostan, Russia. The population was 38 as of 2010. There is 1 street.

Geography 
Novotroitskaya is located 20 km east of Yermolayevo (the district's administrative centre) by road. Krivle-Ilyushkino is the nearest rural locality.

References 

Rural localities in Kuyurgazinsky District